Grayson is primarily a masculine given name. Notable people with the name include:

People with the given name "Grayson" include

Grayson Allen (born 1995), American basketball player
Grayson Barber (born 2000), American soccer player
Grayson Bell (born 1997), Australian swimmer
Grayson Boucher (born 1984), American streetball player
Grayson Bourne, British canoeist
Grayson Capps (born 1967), American singer-songwriter
Grayson Davey (born 2001), American sport shooter
Grayson Dolan (born 1999), American YouTube personality
Grayson Dupont (born 1998), American soccer player
Grayson Earle (born 1987), American artist
Grayson Garvin (born 1989), American baseball player
Grayson Gilbert (born 1990), American entrepreneur
Grayson Greiner (born 1992), American baseball player
Grayson Hajash (1925–2015), American football player
Grayson Hall (1922–1985), American actress
Grayson Hart (born 1988), New Zealand rugby union footballer
Grayson Hoffman (born 1984), American photographer
Grayson Hugh (born 1960), American singer-songwriter
Grayson L. Kirk (1903–1997), American academic administrator
Grayson Lookner, American politician
Grayson McCall (born 2000), American football player
Grayson McCouch (born 1968), American actor
Grayson Moore, Canadian filmmaker
Grayson Murphy (disambiguation), multiple people
Grayson Murray (born 1993), American golfer
Grayson Perry (born 1960), British artist
Grayson Rodriguez (born 1999), American baseball player
Grayson Russell (born 1998), American actor
Grayson Shillingford (1944–2009), West Indian cricketer
Grayson Waller (born 1990), Australian professional wrestler

Fictional characters 
Grayson Sinclair, a character on the British soap opera Emmerdale

See also
Greyson, given name and surname

Given names
English masculine given names